Sir John Keane, 5th Baronet, DSO (3 June 1873 – 30 January 1956) was an Irish barrister and politician.

Early life
Keane was the son of Sir Richard Keane, 4th Baronet and Adelaide Vance, daughter of John Vance MP. He was educated at Clifton College and Royal Military Academy Woolwich. He succeeded his father as 5th Baronet in 1892 and was appointed High Sheriff of County Waterford for 1911–1912. He was a member of Seanad Éireann and a director of Bank of Ireland becoming Governor (Chairman) from 1941 to 1943.

Military career
He was commissioned into the Royal Field Artillery on 17 June 1893; served in South Africa during the Second Boer War (mentioned in despatches, London Gazette 10 September 1901, Queen's South Africa Medal). During World War I, he was mentioned in despatches, awarded the Distinguished Service Order (London Gazette 14 January 1916) and the French Legion of Honour (London Gazette 14 July 1917). He ended the war as a Lieutenant-Colonel in the Royal Tank Corps.

Senate career
Before the creation of the Irish Free State in 1922, Keane had worked with the IAOS, served on Waterford County Council and was a member of the All-for-Ireland League that supported Home Rule.

In 1922, Sir John was nominated by the President of the Executive Council to Seanad Éireann of the Irish Free State, and served until 1934. In 1923 his home at Cappoquin House was burned by anti-government forces in the Irish Civil War, which he then rebuilt. He later served in the reconstituted Seanad Éireann established by the Constitution of Ireland, serving from 1938 to 1948 on the nomination of the Taoiseach. It has been said that, by this time, he was "widely regarded as the quintessence of intelligent ex-unionism".

Shannon electrification scheme
In 1925 he was a major opponent of the Shannon electrification scheme, describing it as "the poisonous virus of nationalisation".

Censorship of publications
In 1942 he was involved in the first occasion on which the Seanad censored itself. On 18 November 1942, Sir John moved: "That, in the opinion of Seanad Éireann, the Censorship of Publications Board appointed by the Minister for Justice under the Censorship of Publications Act, 1929, has ceased to retain public confidence, and that steps should be taken by the Minister to reconstitute the board." and sparked four days of fierce debate, carrying over to 2, 3, and concluding on 9 December 1942.

He quoted extensively from one book The Tailor and Ansty by Eric Cross, which was banned in Ireland soon after its first publication in that year. The Editor of Debates prudishly excluded the quotation from the Official Report; the entry states only: "The Senator quoted from the book". He taunted William Magennis for thinking that two men embracing in another book amounted to sodomy.

At the end of the debate and much discussion in the public press, his point made, Sir John sought leave to withdraw the motion. The question "That leave be given by the Seanad to withdraw the motion, item No. 2, on the Order Paper" was put and negatived. The question on the main motion was then duly put and declared negatived. However Senators claimed for a division, and the motion was defeated: For 2 votes - Sir John Keane and Joseph Johnston - Against 34 votes.

Family
He married Lady Eleanor Lucy Hicks-Beach, the eldest daughter of Michael Hicks-Beach, 1st Earl St Aldwyn and his second wife Lady Lucy Fortescue, with whom he had one son and three daughters.

National Portrait Gallery
The UK's National Portrait Gallery includes three photographic portraits of Sir John Keane taken by Bassano's studio on 30 March 1920.

References

External links
 (gives birth and death as 1873–1956)
The full text of the Official Report of historical debates in the upper (and lower) house of the Irish parliament
Famous Kanes (and Keanes) (gives birth and death as 1872–1960)
 

1873 births
Politicians from County Cork
People educated at Clifton College
1956 deaths
Keane, John, 5th Baronet
Irish businesspeople
Members of the 1922 Seanad
Members of the 1925 Seanad
Members of the 1928 Seanad
Members of the 1931 Seanad
Members of the 2nd Seanad
Members of the 3rd Seanad
Members of the 4th Seanad
Members of the 5th Seanad
Politicians from County Waterford
High Sheriffs of County Waterford
Irish barristers
Royal Tank Regiment officers
Graduates of the Royal Military Academy, Woolwich
Presidential appointees to the Council of State (Ireland)
Royal Artillery officers
Companions of the Distinguished Service Order
British Army personnel of the Second Boer War
British Army personnel of World War I
Nominated members of Seanad Éireann
Independent members of Seanad Éireann